Jack Curtner (9 July 1888 Greenville, Ohio – 1 January 1961 Dayton, Ohio) was an American racecar driver.

Indy 500 results

References

1888 births
1961 deaths
Indianapolis 500 drivers
People from Greenville, Ohio
Racing drivers from Ohio